The 2009 Natomas Men's Professional Tennis Tournament was a professional tennis tournament played on outdoor hard courts. It was the fifth edition of the tournament which was part of the 2009 ATP Challenger Tour. It took place in Sacramento, California, United States between 5 and 11 October 2009.

Singles main-draw entrants

Seeds

 Rankings are as of September 28, 2009.

Other entrants
The following players received wildcards into the singles main draw:
  Alexander Domijan
  Daniel Evans
  Jan-Michael Gambill
  Ryan Harrison

The following player received a Special Exempt into the singles main draw:
  Andre Begemann

The following players received entry from the qualifying draw:
  Treat Conrad Huey
  Raven Klaasen (as a Lucky loser)
  Cecil Mamiit
  Louk Sorensen
  Izak van der Merwe

Champions

Singles

 Santiago Giraldo def.  Jesse Levine, 7–6(4), 6–1

Doubles

 Lester Cook /  David Martin def.  Santiago González /  Travis Rettenmaier, 4–6, 6–3, [10–5]

External links
Official website
ITF Search 
2009 Draws

 
Natomas Men's Professional Tennis Tournament